There are two historic mills called Warwick Mills.  The older of the two is in Pennsylvania and is no longer running.  The other is in New Hampshire, and is still manufacturing today.

The older "Warwick Mills", also known as James Mills with Jacob Hager House and Tenant House, is a historic grist mill complex located in Warwick Township, Chester County, Pennsylvania.  The mill was built about 1784, and is a three- to four-story, banked fieldstone structure.  The manor house was built before 1828, and is a -story, four bays by two bays, random fieldstone dwelling.  The tenant house was also built before 1828, and is a -story, four bays by two bays, stuccoed stone dwelling.  It has a shed-roofed porch and a -story addition.  The mill remained in operation until 1968.  It was added to the National Register of Historic Places in 1974.

The Warwick Mills in New Ipswich, NH is the site of the oldest textile in the state.  Built-in about 1807, it burned down two times and was rebuilt the third time with brick and is the building seen today.  The brick for the building was forged on site and was finished in 1864, with signatures on the beams by craftsmen as far south as Baltimore. It is still a running textile mill.

References

Grinding mills on the National Register of Historic Places in Pennsylvania
Industrial buildings completed in 1784
Houses in Chester County, Pennsylvania
Grinding mills in Pennsylvania
National Register of Historic Places in Chester County, Pennsylvania